The F Word is a hybrid fiction/documentary feature film from 2005, directed by Jed Weintrob and produced by Christian D. Bruun and Nick Goldfarb. The film was selected to world premiere at the 2005 Tribeca Film Festival in New York City.

Plot
Joe Pace is a radio personality whose program, The F Word, is being shut down by the U.S. Federal Communications Commission (FCC) after racking up over $1 million in unpaid indecency fines. On his last day on the air, which coincides with the last day of the 2004 Republican National Convention, Joe sets off to broadcast his own one-man march through Manhattan.

Style and structure
Combining fictional scenes - written by over thirty different writers - set among actual protests with documentary footage of people Joe meets along the way, the film weaves together a seamless narrative. In a uniquely interactive writing process, each day new scenes were written and appropriated to upcoming events and in response to the previous day's footage. It is often impossible to tell the difference between fiction and reality. The concept is loosely inspired by Medium Cool by Haskell Wexler. The film was shot by cinematographer Christian Ditlev Bruun and Heather Greer on two main cameras at 24 frames/second, as well as several other video formats for b-roll. The film was unconventionally color corrected and composited using several different types of software as well as in-camera adjustments creating a unique, photographic expression. Motion graphics, titles, and color grading as well as the official poster and website was designed by Christian D. Bruun.

Cast
Josh Hamilton stars along with Edoardo Ballerini, Zak Orth, Sam Rockwell, Callie Thorne, Waris Ahluwalia, Yul Vazquez and others, including many leaders of the protest movement: Reverend Billy, Peter Camejo, John Perry Barlow.

Technical information 
The film's main cameras were two Panasonic AG-DVX100(b) video cameras, filming at 23.976 fps with Advanced Pulldown. A few additional shots were filmed on other DV cameras using various pulldown techniques in Adobe After Effects. The film was edited using Final Cut Pro, the title sequence and all visual effects - created by Christian D. Bruun - were done using Adobe After Effects. The film was on-lined and output to HD using and Avid Symphony system.

Release
The F Word premiered on April 26, 2005 at the Pace Schimmel Center in official competition at the Tribeca Film Festival. The film premiered on IFC TV on November 6, 2006 and was re-released on Blu-ray and re-premiered on IFC TV May 4, 2008.

See also
Fuck (film)

References

External links
Official website

DVD release
Risky Business: Hollywood Politics
Review By Matthew Gilbert, Boston Globe
Popmatters.com review 2008
The F Word @ IFC
Reverend Billy
eJournal Canada
Tribeca Channel

2005 films
American independent films
2005 documentary films
American documentary films
Documentary films about American politics
Films about freedom of expression
2000s English-language films
2005 independent films
2000s American films